Vono may be,

Vono language,  a nearly extinct Kainji language of Nigeria
Gelsomina Vono (born 1969), Italian politician
Michael Vono (born 1948), American bishop
Vono (brand), a brand of Ajinomoto Co., Inc.